Mazatlania is a genus of sea snails, marine gastropod mollusks in the family Columbellidae, the dove snails.

Species
Species within the genus Mazatlania include:
 Mazatlania cosentini (Philippi, 1836)
 Mazatlania fulgurata (Philippi, 1846)
Species brought into synonymy
 Mazatlania aciculata (Lamarck, 1822): synonym of Mazatlania cosentini (Philippi, 1836)
 Mazatlania hesperia Pilsbry & Lowe, 1932: synonym of Mazatlania fulgurata (Philippi, 1846)

References

External links
 Adams, H. & Adams, A. (1853-1858). The genera of Recent Mollusca; arranged according to their organization. London, van Voorst.

Columbellidae
Monotypic gastropod genera